Don Dixon may refer to:
Don Dixon (artist) (born 1951), space artist, painter and illustrator
Don Dixon (musician) (born 1950), record producer, songwriter, musician, bassist
Don Dixon (footballer) (born 1937), former Australian rules footballer
Don Dixon, Baron Dixon (1929–2017), Labour MP for Jarrow 1979–1997

See also
Donald Dickson Farmer (1877–1956), Scottish recipient of the VC